Mace-Kingsley Ranch School (later called The Ranch School, Inc., and the New Mexico Ranch School) was a Church of Scientology affiliated ranch school for children aged 8 to 17 set in a rural environment. The School opened in 1987 and was initially based in Palmdale, California before moving to a property in the Gila Wilderness, New Mexico. It was eventually closed in 2002 and its certificate of incorporation was revoked. The school's curriculum focused heavily on the teachings of Scientology. Students were subjected to pseudo-scientific processes such as the Purification Rundown and daily auditing. A large portion of each day was dedicated to cleaning and general manual labor. The school received criticism over the years for the treatment of students under its care. Students have reported cases of being underfed as well as being beaten, whipped and publicly humiliated as forms of punishment.

History

The Mace-Kingsley Ranch School was opened in 1987 in Palmdale, California by Scientologists Debra Mace and Carol Kingsley. The school stated that its purpose was to help kids in trouble by creating a safe environment for them away from the influences that were causing them problems. In the early 1990s, the school moved from its Palmdale location to a ranch in the Gila Wilderness, New Mexico. The school was located approximately 9 miles north-east from the town of Reserve on New Mexico State Road 12. The ranch was situated on 158 acres of land comprising two main areas, the upper ranch and the lower ranch. Attached to this was another 14,120 acres leased from the US Forest Service.

The school was coeducational and was responsible for children as young as 8 years old. The boys dormitories were located at the lower ranch where most of the daily activities took place and the girls dormitories were at the upper ranch, around 2 miles away. The school was eventually shut down in 2002 and its certificate of incorporation was revoked. After the school closed, the property was re-branded as the Hacienda del Espirito and was advertised for sale in 2003 at $1,700,000, later that year the sale price was raised to $2,000,000 before eventually being reduced to $1,499,000 in 2005.

Scientology methodology

 The school utilized the "Study Technology" methodology developed by Scientology founder L. Ron Hubbard. A copyright notice on the school's website gave "grateful acknowledgement" to the L. Ron Hubbard library for usage of works of the Scientology founder. The website also acknowledged that the school was "licensed" to use educational methodology from Applied Scholastics, a "service mark" owned by Association for Better Living and Education. The school's website also noted that terms including Dianetics, Scientology, Purification Rundown, and Oxford Capacity Analysis "are trademarks and service marks" of the Religious Technology Center. The school was endorsed by actress and Scientologist Kelly Preston.

Lon Woodbury of Woodbury Reports visited the school site in 2000, and evaluated it on his website in 2001. He noted that many of the classes were based on techniques developed by L. Ron Hubbard, and commented: "For a parent considering Mace-Kingsley Ranch School for their child, I would recommend obtaining at least a basic knowledge of Scientology. Since that is so central to the school’s program, it would be vital for the parents to be comfortable with its major tenets."

Upon arrival at the school students were first administered an IQ test before being subjected to the Purification Rundown. Students were then given the Oxford Capacity Analysis, a pseudo-scientific Scientology personality test originally designed in the early 1950s. In order to graduate from the program, students were required to complete The 10 requirements which included steps such as "orientation and willingness", "changing past patterns" and "demonstrating lessons learned". Daily auditing using E-Meters was also required of students.

Mace-Kingsley Family Center

Some time after opening the Mace-Kingsley Ranch School, Debra Mace and Carol Kingsley opened the Mace-Kingsley Family Center in Clearwater, Florida. The family center caters to Scientologist families and runs a number of programs for children based on the writings of L. Ron Hubbard. These programs include auditing, the purification rundown and ethics handling. Scientologists can bring their young children, even infants to be audited at the center.

Criticism

Rolling Stone Magazine

Rolling Stone magazine investigated the school before its closure. The article by Janet Reitman, "Inside Scientology", was critical of the school's practices. Reitman noted, "The school enforced a rigid Scientology focus that many former students now say served as both a mechanism of control and a form of religious indoctrination". This Rolling Stone article was selected for inclusion in The Best American Magazine Writing 2007, published by Columbia University Press.

Phoenix New Times

In an interview in 2009 with the Phoenix New Times regarding his time at the school, Charlie Brand of the Miniature Tigers said, "It was bizarre because my family's not Scientologists. My parents thought it was for troubled teens. [The camp] forced Scientology on you, and you had to go through the steps before you could leave. You had to use an E-Meter and study guides about all their beliefs. I fought it for a while but eventually was like, 'Yeah, this Scientology stuff is great,' and faked it".

Leah Remini: Scientology and the aftermath

The A&E program Leah Remini: Scientology and the Aftermath aired an episode entirely dedicated to the ranch entitled "The Ranches". In the episode, former students Tara Reile and Nathan Rich make multiple accusations of child abuse and neglect.

The show featured an audio recording of Wally Hanks repeatedly whipping a child with a belt while yelling at him to "look at that picture of LRH (L Ron Hubbard)." After his death in 2017, Hanks’ nephew, Brian Hanks was interviewed by Tony Ortega of The Underground Bunker where it was noted that Hanks still kept the paddle he used on students at the ranch mounted on his wall.

Before the episode went to air, the Church of Scientology released their own short documentaries on both Rich and Reile. The documentaries featured interviews with family members of both Rich and Reile as well as describing incidents that both had been involved in soon after graduating from the school.

Nathan Rich Book
In 2018, Nathan Rich published a book about his experiences in Scientology and at the ranch. According to reviewer Tony Ortega, "Scythe Tleppo is a roller coaster ride between these moments of clarity and one shocking scene after another told in brutal detail about the ways Nathan was abused, the ways he abused himself, and his ever downward spiral to homelessness and near-suicidal drug use."

References

External links
 The Ranch School/Mace-Kingsley Ranch School (Archive)
 New Mexico Ranch School (Archive)

Scientology-related schools
Defunct schools in California
Defunct schools in New Mexico
Educational institutions established in 1987
Educational institutions disestablished in 2002
Ranch schools
Education in Catron County, New Mexico
1987 establishments in California
2002 disestablishments in California
Behavior modification
Human rights abuses